The Wandas is the second studio album by the Wandas, independently released in conjunction with the band's publishing company, TFMRA, LLC in 2011. It was featured in USA TODAY, American Songwriter,Paste Magazine and Spinner.  The album was named one of the "50 best albums of the first half of 2011" by Guitar World Magazine.

Track listing
 "Do or Die" –  3:56 McEachern / Battey 
 "Forever and Ever" – 4:02 McEachern / Battey 
 "Tied a Knot" – 3:45 McEachern
 "Mr. Mister" – 2:50 McEachern
 "Loaded" - 4:36 McEachern
 "Shotguns and Booze" – 2:32 McEachern
 "I Think it's Time (you got over yourself)" – 3:42 McEachern / Bierce
 "Feel It." – 3:16 McEachern
 "Longtime Running" – 4:22 Battey / McEachern
 "Abandon Ship" – 6:38 Battey
 "Everything Has Changed – 3:10 McEachern

Personnel
The Wandas
Keith McEachern - Lead vocals, electric and acoustic guitar, synth, keys, piano, b3 organ, glockenspiel, percussion
Brent Battey - Electric guitar, background vocals, lead vocals on "Abandon Ship"
Ross Lucivero - Bass guitar, additional guitar on I Think it's Time (you got over yourself)
William Bierce -  Drums, percussion, background vocals, additional piano on Forever and Ever
Liam O'Neil - Wurlitzer, tenor saxophone 
Chris Seligman - French Horn

Technical
Patrick Krief - Producer, additional guitars on Abandon Ship, Cowbell on Feel It.
Dave Schiffman - Mixer
J. Saliba - Engineer
Ryan Morey - Mastering

References

2011 albums
The Wandas albums